Bondarcevomyces is a genus of fungus in the Tapinellaceae family. It is a monotypic genus, containing the single species Bondarcevomyces taxi, found in Asia. The species was originally described as Polyporus taxi by Appolinaris Semyonovich Bondartsev (or Apollinari Semjonowitsch Bondarzew) in 1940, and was transferred to the genera Hapalopilus, Tyromyces, and Parmastomyces before being made the type of the newly created Bondarcevomyces, published in Mycotaxon Vol.70 on page 219 in 1999.

The genus name of Bondarcevomyces is in honour of Margarita Appollinarievna Bondartseva (b.1935), a Russian botanist and wife of Bondartsev.

References

External links
 

Boletales
Monotypic Boletales genera
Fungi of Asia
Fungi described in 1940